The Treaty of Vienna (also known as the Peace of Vienna) was signed on 23 June 1606 between Stephen Bocskay, Prince of Transylvania, and Rudolf II, Holy Roman Emperor. Based on the terms of the treaty, all constitutional and religious rights and privileges were granted to the Hungarians in both Transylvania and Royal Hungary. In Sopron, for instance, the agreement recognized the autocracy of Hungarian Lutherans; in Transylvania, the Calvinists gained religious tolerance. The accord also recognized Bocskay as the Prince of Transylvania and guaranteed the right of Transylvanians to elect their own independent princes in the future.

Due to its importance for the Calvinists in Hungary and Transylvania, the first sentences of the treaty and its signing are depicted on the Reformation Wall in Geneva, a monument that honours important figures of the Protestant Reformation, next to the statue of Stephen Bocskay. 

Since Stephen Bocskay had sought the support of the Ottoman Empire,  the Treaty of Vienna was followed by the Peace of Zsitvatorok between Sultan Ahmed I and Archduke Matthias of Austria (11 November 1606).

See also
 List of treaties
 Bocskai Uprising
 Peace of Zsitvatorok

References

 Nemes Elek: Az 1606-ki bécsi békekötés létrejöttének története. Erdélyi Múzeum, VI. évf. 1. sz. (1879. jan. 1.)[History of making the Treaty of Vienna in 1606].
 Az 1606. évi bécsi és zsitvatoroki béke. Bocskay halála[Treaty of Vienna and Zitvatorok in 1606, Death of [Istvan] Bocskay]. In Bánlaky József: A magyar nemzet hadtörténelme.[Military history of Hungarian nation] . Budapest: Arcanum. 2001. 
 A bécsi és zsitvatoroki béke[History of Treaty of Vienna and Treaty of Zitvatorok] . In A magyar nemzet története[History of the Hungarian nation] . Szerk. Szilágyi Sándor. Budapest: Arcanum. 2002.

External links
 The Columbia Encyclopedia - Matthias
 Kornél Bárdos: Andreas Rauch in Sopron

1606 in the Habsburg monarchy
17th century in Austria
1606 treaties
Vienna
Vienna
1606 in Europe
Rudolf II, Holy Roman Emperor